Dwight Hollier (born April 21, 1969) is a former American football linebacker who played professionally in the National Football League (NFL) with the Miami Dolphins and the Indianapolis Colts. Hollier attended the University of North Carolina at Chapel Hill, where he played college football.

References

External links
 

Living people
1969 births
American football linebackers
Miami Dolphins players
Jacksonville Jaguars players
North Carolina Tar Heels football players
Sportspeople from Hampton, Virginia
Players of American football from Virginia